"Someday" is a song written by American country music singer Alan Jackson and Jim McBride, and recorded by Jackson. It was released in August 1991 as the second single from Jackson's second album, Don't Rock The Jukebox. The song peaked at number 1 on the Billboard Hot Country Singles & Tracks chart, and number 2 on the Canadian RPM Country Tracks chart.

Content
The narrator in the song is seeing his relationship with his significant other end because she’s finally moving on. The man was always saying he’d get his act together someday, but someday never came around and she got sick of waiting. At the end of the song, the narrator proves he has gotten his act together by fixing up an old car he said he'd get around to "someday" and driving to his ex's work where she drives off with him.

Critical reception
Kevin John Coyne of Country Universe gave the song an A grade, saying that "one of Jackson’s greatest strengths as a writer is that he’s able to craft lyrics that weave everyday jargon into poetry. The man and woman here talk like real people talk, but the conversation is structured in such a way that it elevates it into art."

Music video
The music video was directed by Mark Lindquist and premiered in mid-1991.

Peak chart positions
"Someday" debuted at No. 50 on the U.S. Billboard Hot Country Singles & Tracks for the week of August 31, 1991.

Year-end charts

References

1991 singles
1991 songs
Alan Jackson songs
Songs written by Alan Jackson
Songs written by Jim McBride (songwriter)
Song recordings produced by Keith Stegall
Song recordings produced by Scott Hendricks
Arista Nashville singles